Shulman Peak is a peak rising to ,  southwest of Sponsors Peak in the Cruzen Range of Victoria Land. It was named by the Advisory Committee on Antarctic Names in 2005 after Leonard M. Shulman of the Bartol Research Institute, University of Delaware, Newark, DE, who maintained, calibrated, and upgraded neutron monitors at Amundsen–Scott South Pole Station and McMurdo Station for 13 field seasons, from 1991 to 2005.

References

Mountains of Victoria Land